Karen Renee Baker (born 1963) is an Associate Justice for Position 6 of the Arkansas Supreme Court. Baker was first elected to the state Supreme Court in 2010. Prior to serving as justice on the Arkansas Supreme Court, Baker served as associate judge for the Arkansas Court of Appeals from 2001-2010, as 20th Judicial District Circuit/Chancery Judge from 1997-2000, and as 20th Judicial District Circuit/Chancery/Juvenile Judge from 1995-1996. She was also the public defender for Van Buren and Searcy counties from 1989-1995. Baker earned her undergraduate degree from Arkansas Tech University in 1983, and her Juris Doctor from the University of Arkansas at Little Rock Law School in 1987.

References

External links
http://judgepedia.org/Karen_R._Baker
http://votesmart.org/candidate/biography/71342/karen-baker#.VBIowiwtCUk

Justices of the Arkansas Supreme Court
Living people
People from Clinton, Arkansas
University of Arkansas School of Law alumni
Arkansas Tech University alumni
21st-century American judges
21st-century American women judges
Public defenders
Year of birth uncertain
1963 births